Vanchi or Vanji may refer to:

 Vanchi (early historic), the early historic headquarters of the Chera lineage in south India
Vanchi Karur, present-day Karur, medieval capital of the Kongu Cheras/Keralas
 Mahodaya-puram (Makotai) or Vanchi (Thiruvanchikulam), present-day Kodungallur, medieval capital of the Chera/Perumals
 Vanchinathan or Vanchi (1886–1911), Hindu Nationalist
 Vanji language, an extinct Pamir language